The qualification matches for Group 3 of the European zone (UEFA) of the 1994 FIFA World Cup qualification tournament took place between April 1992 and November 1993. The teams competed on a home-and-away basis with the winner and runner-up claiming 2 of the 12 spots in the final tournament allocated to the European zone. The group consisted of Albania, Denmark, Latvia, Lithuania, Northern Ireland, the Republic of Ireland and Spain.

One of the most notable topics of the group was the Republic of Ireland and Northern Ireland being in the same group ('The Troubles' were still ongoing). The Republic would clinch qualification in the final round of games by drawing away to their northern rivals, while Spain's 1–0 win over Denmark meant they qualified as winners.

Standings

Results

Goalscorers

7 goals

 Julio Salinas

6 goals

 John Aldridge

4 goals

 Frank Pingel

3 goals

 Kim Vilfort
 Steve Staunton
 Ainārs Linards
 Kevin Wilson
 Txiki Begiristain
 Fernando Hierro

2 goals

 Sokol Kushta
 Brian Laudrup
 Paul McGrath
 Niall Quinn
 Robertas Fridrikas
 Jim Magilton
 Jimmy Quinn
 Gerry Taggart
 José Mari Bakero
 José Luis Caminero
 Julen Guerrero
 Míchel

1 goal

 Edmond Abazi
 Sulejman Demollari
 Ilir Kepa
 Altin Rraklli
 John Jensen
 Henrik Larsen
 Peter Møller
 Lars Olsen
 Flemming Povlsen
 Mark Strudal
 Tony Cascarino
 Alan Kernaghan
 Alan McLoughlin
 Kevin Sheedy
 John Sheridan
 Andy Townsend
 Oļegs Aleksejenko
 Virginijus Baltušnikas
 Stasys Baranauskas
 Arminas Narbekovas
 Eimantas Poderis
 Viačeslavas Sukristovas
 Andrėjus Tereškinas
 Colin Clarke
 Mal Donaghy
 Iain Dowie
 Phil Gray
 Alan McDonald
 Adolfo Aldana
 Thomas Christiansen
 Pep Guardiola
 Cristóbal Parralo
 Alfonso Pérez
 Toni

Notes

External links
 Group 3 Detailed Results at RSSSF

3
1992–93 in Spanish football
Qual
1992–93 in Republic of Ireland association football
Qual
1992–93 in Northern Ireland association football
1993–94 in Northern Ireland association football
1992–93 in Danish football
1993–94 in Danish football
1992–93 in Albanian football
1993–94 in Albanian football
1992 in Lithuanian football
1993 in Lithuanian football
1992 in Latvian football
1993 in Latvian football
1991–92 in Spanish football
1991–92 in Albanian football
1991–92 in Northern Ireland association football
1991–92 in Republic of Ireland association football